Randy Evan Barnett (born February 5, 1952) is an American legal scholar. He serves as the Patrick Hotung Professor of Constitutional Law at Georgetown University, where he teaches constitutional law and contracts, and is the director of the Georgetown Center for the Constitution.

After graduating from Northwestern University and Harvard Law School, Barnett tried many felony cases as a prosecutor in the Cook County State's Attorney's Office in Chicago. A recipient of a Guggenheim Fellowship in Constitutional Studies and the Bradley Prize, Barnett has been a visiting professor at Penn, Northwestern and Harvard Law School.

In 2004, he argued the medical marijuana case of Gonzalez v. Raich before the U.S. Supreme Court. In 2012, he was one of the lawyers representing the National Federation of Independent Business in its constitutional challenge to the Affordable Care Act in NFIB v. Sebelius. He blogs on the Volokh Conspiracy.

Life and career
Randy Barnett was born on February 5, 1952, in Chicago, Illinois. After high school, he attended Northwestern University, graduating in 1974 with a B.A. in philosophy. He then studied law at the Harvard Law School, graduating with a J.D. in 1977. After law school, Barnett returned to Chicago and worked as an Illinois state prosecutor for Cook County, Illinois. He spent the 1981–82 academic year as a research fellow at the University of Chicago Law School, then, in the fall of 1982, began his academic career as an assistant professor of law at the Chicago-Kent College of Law. In 1993, Barnett was hired as a professor of law at the Boston University School of Law. In 2006, Barnett left Boston and began teaching at the Georgetown University Law Center, where he remains today.

Jurisprudence 
In The Structure of Liberty, Barnett offers a libertarian theory of law and politics.  Barnett calls his theory "the liberal conception of justice" and emphasizes the relationship between legal libertarianism and classical liberalism. He argues private adjudication and enforcement of law, with market forces eliminating inefficiencies and inequities, to be the only legal system that can provide adequate solutions to the problems of interest, power, and knowledge.

He discusses theories of constitutional legitimacy and methods of constitutional interpretation in Restoring the Lost Constitution.

There have been several criticisms and reviews of his theory, including Stephan Kinsella, Richard Epstein,
David N. Mayer,
Lawrence B. Solum and John K. Palchak and Stanley T. Leung.

Supreme Court cases
Barnett was also lead lawyer for the plaintiffs in Ashcroft v. Raich (later Gonzales v. Raich), which he won before the Ninth Circuit, which ruled that federal action against legal marijuana patients violated the Commerce Clause. Barnett's side, however, lost on appeal at the Supreme Court, which ruled that Congress had the power to enforce federal
marijuana prohibition in states that had legalized medical marijuana.
He was also involved in the famous Affordable Care Act case National Federation of Independent Business v. Sebelius.

Constitutional theory
Barnett has also done work on the theory of the United States Constitution, culminating in his books Restoring the Lost Constitution and Our Republican Constitution. He argues for an originalist theory of constitutional interpretation and for constitutional construction based on a presumption of liberty, not popular sovereignty.

Barnett also focuses on the history and original meaning of the Second and Ninth Amendments to the United States Constitution. He has advanced the Standard Model interpretation that the Second Amendment protects an individual right to bear arms, subject to federal regulation under Congress's power to organize the militia in Article I, Section 8 of the Constitution.

Ninth Amendment
Barnett is a proponent of the view that the Ninth Amendment's rights "retained by the people" should be vigorously enforced by the federal judiciary. In a 2006 article, Barnett wrote:

Regarding what stature and force natural rights had before some of them were enumerated, Barnett says that federal courts did not have authority to enforce such rights against the states. He wrote in the same 2006 article:

A related issue is whether the original unamended Constitution gave federal courts authority to enforce unenumerated natural rights against congressional regulation of the federal district. Barnett has indicated that federal courts had such authority and that enumerated rights "had the same stature and force" in the district even before they were enumerated. He has indicated that the case of Bolling v. Sharpe (dealing with integration of public schools in the District of Columbia) is hard to justify textually from the Constitution, and if it were to be overturned, Congress would create more laws desegregating the district, which would be justified in his view of the Constitution.

The question of what constitutional rights citizens possessed in the federal district has ramifications for the meaning of the Privileges or Immunities Clause of the Fourteenth Amendment. In 2003, Barnett wrote:

If no such federal constitutional protection of unenumerated rights existed in the federal district prior to the Fourteenth Amendment, only enumerated rights may have been extended by it.

Repeal Amendment
Barnett has proposed a Repeal Amendment to the United States Constitution, which would give two thirds of the states the power to repeal any federal law or regulation. According to Barnett, the proposed amendment "provides a targeted way to reverse particular congressional acts and administrative regulations without relying on federal judges or permanently amending the text of the Constitution to correct a specific abuse." He described the intent of the amendment as follows:

Barnett's proposal has received interest from many politicians and academics, even those who do not share his libertarian beliefs. "[A] number of congressional Republicans, including soon-to-be House Majority Leader Eric Cantor" have endorsed the proposal, as has Attorney General of Virginia Ken Cuccinelli. Republican Congressman Rob Bishop of Utah introduced the amendment in the House of Representatives. University of Texas Law Professor Sanford Levinson has said that the Repeal Amendment "ha[s] the merit of recognizing that structures matter.".

Bill of Federalism

The Bill of Federalism  is a list of ten proposed amendments to the United States Constitution by Barnett. It would enshrine in the Constitution certain ideas based on states' rights and free market libertarianism. Barnett drafted the bill in response to the Tea Party movement's emphasis on limiting federal powers. The present draft of the document was published on May 13, 2009 and incorporated much of the feedback that Barnett had received in response to the previous draft. The document is an expansion of an earlier 'Federalist Amendment' that Barnett composed as part of an article he wrote in the Wall Street Journal.

Barnett advocates for the states to call for a Constitutional Convention in which they would propose the amendments comprising the bill. Alternatively, the United States Congress could propose the amendments to the states, as they have done every time a Convention to propose amendments has been called for.

The amendments, summarized by number below, would do the following;
 Disallow federal income taxes (repeal Sixteenth Amendment), as well as gift, estate, and consumption taxes; allow FairTax; require a three-fifths supermajority to raise or set new taxes
 Set limits on the Interstate Commerce Clause
 Disallow unfunded mandates and conditions on funding.
 Close a constitutional loophole that allows treaties to override established limits on power
 Extend free speech consideration to campaign contributions and to cover any medium of communication (including the Internet)
 Allow a resolution of three fourths of the states to rescind any federal law or regulation.
 Establish term limits for Senators and Representatives.
 Provide the President with a line-item veto to balance the budget on any year in which it is unbalanced.
 Reinforce the Ninth Amendment by specifying additional rights and by providing a process for any person to prove the existence of an unenumerated right.
 Restrict judicial activism by mandating an originalist method of interpretation.

History
On April 16, 2009, Barnett appeared on the Glenn Beck Show to address the question, "What redress do states have who are tired of getting kicked around by the federal government?" Barnett proposed the idea of passing a constitutional amendment and argued that by threatening to hold a constitutional convention, the states could force Congress to propose the amendment to them.

Barnett then wrote an article for the Wall Street Journal, "The Case for a Federalism Amendment." It was published in the editorial section on April 24, 2009. In it he expounded on his idea for forcing Congress to propose an amendment to the states, and included a draft for a five-sectioned "Federalist Amendment", which would strengthen states' rights and restrict federal power.

On May 13, 2009, Barnett released the intended final draft. Barnett removed amendment 3, which declared the existence of police powers of states. He condensed amendments 4 and 5, which disallowed income and estate taxes respectively, into one amendment now listed as number 1. That made room for two additional amendments not present in the earlier draft. One prevents treaties from enlarging Congress' power in what might be thought of as a Constitutional loophole. Another applies the right to free speech to any medium, including the Internet, and also makes campaign contribution a form of protected free speech. 

The Bill of Federalism Project has been incorporated as a nonprofit agency in the State of Tennessee.

Ratification strategy
Barnett would like the states to call for a Constitutional Convention. That was his main proposition when he appeared on the Glenn Beck show, with the actual amendments being drafted later. He has drafted a resolution to call for a convention. He believes that to be a necessary step, as Congress would not voluntarily propose amendments that largely weaken its power.

Gerard N. Magliocca has written an article supporting the idea of calling for a Convention.

Criticism
The John Birch Society has criticized the idea of calling for a constitutional convention, calling it a "dangerous temptation" and a "threat to our Constitution."

Amendments of the Bill of Federalism

Amendment I – Restrictions on Tax Powers of Congress

Section 1 of the amendment would disallow federal income, gift, estate, and consumption taxes. It would explicitly permit a national sales tax, an idea which has been proposed in the United States as the FairTax. Section 2 would require a supermajority of three-fifths of both houses of Congress for any new tax or tax increase. Section 3 repeals the Sixteenth Amendment and delays the implementation of the whole amendment for five years after it is ratified to give Congress time to dismantle the IRS.

The amendment is partially a combination of the fifth and sixth amendments of the previous draft.

Amendment II – Limits of Commerce Power

The Constitution grants Congress the power to "regulate commerce with foreign nations, and among the several states, and with the Indian tribes." That is amplified by the additional power "To make all Laws which shall be necessary and proper for carrying into Execution the foregoing Powers. ... " The amendment would overrule the current interpretation of the commerce clause by removing three applications of the interstate commerce clause: the regulation of an activity having effects outside of a state, the regulation of instrumentalities of interstate commerce, and regulation as part of a broader regulatory scheme.

 In Wickard v. Filburn, the Supreme Court ruled that Congress could regulate the production of wheat by a farmer named Roscoe Filburn despite the fact that Filburn did not intend to sell any of the wheat across state lines. The court ruled that since in the aggregate, unregulated wheat could have an effect on interstate commerce, it was covered by the commerce clause.
 The Court has held, "Congress is empowered to regulate and protect the instrumentalities of interstate commerce, or persons or things in interstate commerce, even though the threat may come only from intrastate activities." In one instance, the Court upheld federal safety regulations of vehicles used in intrastate commerce, on the grounds that they run on highways of interstate commerce.
 In Gonzales v. Raich, the court ruled that the commerce clause extended to noneconomic regulatory schemes of congress.

Amendment III – Unfunded Mandates and Conditions on Spending

The first clause of the amendment would disallow unfunded mandates so Congress could not make laws, even within its power, if they would require the states or their political subdivisions, such as cities, to spend money unless they were fully reimbursed by Congress.

The court has ruled in Printz v. United States that the federal government cannot directly force a state to pass any law or regulation. However, by the precedent set in South Dakota v. Dole, Congress can make routine, unrelated funding conditional upon state compliance with regulation that Congress cannot itself enact. The National Minimum Drinking Age Act was the subject of Dole and uses such a mechanism, as did the National Maximum Speed Law while it was still law. The second clause of the amendment would prevent Congress from using conditional funding to induce the states to enact any law if it would "restrict the liberties of its citizens."

Amendment IV – No Abuse of the Treaty Power

The Constitution grants to the president the Treaty Clause power "by and with the Advice and Consent of the Senate, to make Treaties, provided two thirds of the Senators present concur." The Constitution also grants to the Congress the power "To make all Laws which shall be necessary and proper for carrying into Execution the foregoing Powers and all other Powers vested by this Constitution in the Government of the United States, or in any Department or Officer thereof." Based on that clause, the Supreme Court held in Missouri v. Holland that Congress can make laws implementing a treaty even if such laws would otherwise be outside of Congress' power to enact. Many thought the decision to be unwise and feared that the federal government could essentially bypass any Constitutional limits by simply enacting treaties granting itself any powers that it saw fit. Such concerns led to the Bricker Amendment of the 1950s, designed to restrict the treaty power. The Bricker Amendment came up a single vote short of the two thirds majority it needed.

The amendment would similarly overturn Missouri, preventing any treaty from enlarging Congress' power. However, the Supreme Court's 1957 Reid v. Covert decision reversed Missouri in that treaties must respect the Constitution, to be valid.

Amendment V – Freedom of Political Speech and Press

The amendment would expand the scope of the right to free speech to apply to campaign contributions, thereby making it illegal for charges or imprisonment in terms of campaign finance laws. It would make laws such as McCain-Feingold illegal. McCain-Feingold made it illegal for anybody not directly connected with a campaign to voice issues related to that campaign within 30 days of a primary election and 60 days within a general election. The amendment also extends freedom of speech rights to the internet.

Amendment VI – Power of States to Check Federal Power

The amendment would provide for the states to have a collective veto power over congress without having to go through the courts. At least 38 of the 50 states would disapprove of an act of congress. It continues to attract political support as the "Repeal Amendment."

Amendment VII – Term Limits for Congress

The amendment would simply limit the terms of any representative or senator. A representative would be limited to six terms, plus one year of a previous representative's term. Meanwhile, senators would be limited to two terms, plus three years of a previous senator's term.

That is based on the 22nd Amendment of the US Constitution which limits the President to two terms in office and two years of another President's term, for a total of ten years.

Amendment VIII – Balanced Budget Line Item Veto

The amendment requires a line-item veto to be established for the President. Section 1 establishes a definition of an unbalanced budget by stating that it is when public debt at the end of one fiscal year (September 30 of the calendar year) is greater than the preceding one. Section 2 allows the President to approve or disapprove of any part of any separate legislation except one that allows for the operation of Congress or the judiciary.  Section 3 simply sends the disapproved items to the US House for separate consideration. Section 4 forces Congress to pass a line-item veto law after the amendment is ratified. The amendment is a direct result of an overturned law that Bill Clinton had in his second term as president.

Amendment IX – The Rights Retained by the People

The amendment is a direct cousin of the Tenth Amendment, but it applies to the people of the U.S. and not the states.

Section 1 puts the Declaration of Independence into coded law. That includes its preamble, which allows for people to live their lives the way they see fit. The proposed right of "making binding contracts of their choosing" would appear to resurrect the legal doctrine of economic due process, which during the Lochner era, was used by the Supreme Court to strike down a wide variety of state and federal laws affecting business, including child-labor and minimum-wage laws.

Section 2 allows all legal persons of the United States to challenge any law that restricts their rights, and puts the burden of proof (fact) on federal, state, and local governments to argue otherwise. Any attempt to establish the constitutionality of any law is thus rested within the government.

Amendment X – Neither Foreign Law nor American Judges May Alter the Meaning of Constitution

The amendment establishes a strict interpretation of the Constitution as written and bans the practice of some judges having a broad interpretation including establishing foreign laws into their decisions, which could change the meaning of an article or section of the Constitution.

Amendment XIV
With Evan Bernick, Barnett reviews the history and sources of the amendment as well as its misunderstanding and legal misuse in the Belknap Press title The Original Meaning of the Fourteenth Amendment: Its Letter and Spirit. Barnett's reading of Lysander Spooner was instrumental in changing his constitutional theory.

Contract theory 

Barnett also writes about contract theories. He has advanced a theory of contract formation that emphasizes the intention to be bound as the key to contract law. He also has worked on the idea of a default rule, a rule of contract law that binds the parties if their contract does not cover the eventuality or condition that is the subject of the default rule.

Criticism 

Austrian School economist and libertarian legal theorist Walter Block has criticized Barnett's arguments for the inalienability of certain rights.

Family 

Barnett is married to Beth Barnett. Their son, Gary Barnett, attended Georgetown University Law Center and now works as a prosecuting attorney in Brooklyn, New York. Their daughter, Laura Barnett, lives in Washington, D.C. and works for the Institute for Humane Studies.

Bibliography

Books
 Our Republican Constitution: Securing the Liberty and Sovereignty of We the People (2016)
 Restoring the Lost Constitution: The Presumption of Liberty (2004)
 The Structure of Liberty: Justice and the Rule of Law (1998)
 Contract Cases and Doctrine (1995, 2d ed 1999, 3d ed 2003, 4th ed 2008)
 Perspectives on Contract Law (1995, 2d ed 2001, 3d ed 2005)

Articles
 "Justice Kennedy's Libertarian Revolution: Lawrence v. Texas" (Social Science Research Network 2003).
 Barnett, "Restitution: A New Paradigm of Criminal Justice" (Ethics 87, no. 4, July 1977).

Movies
 InAlienable (2008)  Assistant to Crystal Barry (Marina Sirtis) (InAlienable IMDB entry)

References

External links 
 RandyBarnett.com
 Appearances at the U.S. Supreme Court from the Oyez Project
 
 

1952 births
Living people
20th-century American lawyers
21st-century American lawyers
American male bloggers
American bloggers
American legal scholars
American legal writers
American libertarians
American male writers
American political writers
American prosecutors
Boston University School of Law faculty
Cato Institute people
Federalist Society members
Georgetown University Law Center faculty
Harvard Law School alumni
Illinois Institute of Technology faculty
Illinois lawyers
Libertarian theorists
Northwestern University alumni
21st-century American non-fiction writers